Standard City is a village in Macoupin County, Illinois, United States. The population was 135 at the 2020 census.

Geography

Demographics

As of the census of 2000, there were 138 people, 58 households, and 41 families residing in the village. The racial makeup of the village was 99.28% White and 0.72% Asian.

There were 58 households, out of which 32.8% had children under the age of 18 living with them, 55.2% were married couples living together, 8.6% had a female householder with no husband present, and 29.3% were non-families. 22.4% of all households were made up of individuals, and 15.5% had someone living alone who was 65 years of age or older. The average household size was 2.38 and the average family size was 2.73.

In the village, the population was spread out, with 22.5% under the age of 18, 13.8% from 18 to 24, 31.2% from 25 to 44, 22.5% from 45 to 64, and 10.1% who were 65 years of age or older. The median age was 35 years. For every 100 females, there were 102.9 males. For every 100 females age 18 and over, there were 101.9 males.

The median income for a household in the village was $19,688, and the median income for a family was $25,000. Males had a median income of $22,500 versus $17,500 for females. The per capita income for the village was $22,852. There were 18.8% of families and 22.5% of the population living below the poverty line, including 25.8% of under eighteens and 27.3% of those over 64.

References

Villages in Macoupin County, Illinois
Villages in Illinois